Kuznetsovsky is a rural locality (a khutor) in Krasnoarmeyskoye Rural Settlement, Novonikolayevsky District, Volgograd Oblast, Russia. The population was 33 as of 2010. There are 3 streets.

Geography 
Kuznetsovsky is located in steppe, on the Khopyorsko-Buzulukskaya Plain, 61 km east of Novonikolayevsky (the district's administrative centre) by road. Belorechensky is the nearest rural locality.

References 

Rural localities in Novonikolayevsky District